Matilda of Ringelheim ( – 14 March 968), also known as Saint Matilda, was a Saxon noblewoman. Due to her marriage to Henry I in 909, she became the first Ottonian queen. Her eldest son, Otto I, restored the Holy Roman Empire in 962. Matilda founded several spiritual institutions and women's convents. She was considered to be extremely pious, righteous and charitable. Matilda's two hagiographical biographies and The Deeds of the Saxons serve as authoritative sources about her life and work.

Early life and marriage with Henry I
Matilda, daughter of Reinhild and the Saxon count Dietrich (himself a descendant of the Saxon duke Widukind who fought against Charlemagne) was born in around 892, and was raised by her grandmother Matilda in Herford Abbey. She had three sisters; Amalrada, Bia and Fridarun, who married Charles III, king of West Francia; and a brother, Beuve II, the Bishop of Châlons-sur-Marne. Due to Fridarun's marriage to count Wichmann the Elder, there was an alliance between the House of Billung and the Ottonian family, which expanded their possessions to the west. In 909, she married Henry, at the time Duke of Saxony and later East Franconian king, after his first marriage to Hatheburg of Merseburg was cancelled.

In 929, Matilda received her dowry, which Henry gave to her in the so-called Hausordnung. It consisted of goods in Quedlinburg, Pöhlde, Nordhausen, Grona (near Göttingen) and Duderstadt. As queen, she took an interest in women's monasteries and is said to have had an influence on her husband's reign by having a strong sense of justice.

Children 
Through Henry, Matilda gave birth to five children:  

 Otto (912–973), who was crowned the Holy Roman Emperor in 962; 
 Henry (919/22–955), who was appointed Duke of Bavaria in 948; 
 Bruno (925–965), who was elected Archbishop of Cologne in 953 and Duke of Lorraine in 954; 
 Hedwig (d. 965/80), who married the West Frankish duke Hugh the Great
 Gerberga (d. 968/69), who first married Gilbert, Duke of Lorraine and later the Carolingian king Louis IV of France.

Life as a widow
After Henry's death 936 in Memleben, he was buried in Quedlinburg, where Queen Matilda founded a convent the same year. She lived there during the following years and took care of the family's memorialization. Thus, Quedlinburg Abbey became the most important center of prayer and commemoration of the dead in the East Franconian empire. 

Like in other convents, daughters of noble families were raised in Quedlinburg, to later become Abbesses in order to secure the families influence. One of them was her own granddaughter, Matilda, daughter of Otto I and Adelheid of Burgundy, to whom she passed on the conducting of the convent in 966, after 30 years of leadership. The younger Matilda therefore became the first abbess of the convent in Quedlinburg. With her other goods, Queen Matilda founded further convents, one of them in 947 in Enger. Her last foundation was the convent of Nordhausen in 961.

Matilda's handling of her dowry, which she had received from King Henry I previous to his death, was subject to a dispute between her and Otto I during the years 936–946. Otto made a claim on his mother's possessions, which eventually led to her fleeing into exile. Otto's wife, Queen Eadgyth, is said to have brought about the reconciliation in which Matilda left her goods and Otto was forgiven for his actions. 

The exact circumstances of this feud are still controversial to this day, but in order to protect her goods, Matilda acquired papal privileges for all monasteries in eastern Saxony in the period before her death in early 968. However, these efforts were ignored when Theophanu, the wife of Otto II, received Matilda's dowry after she died.

Death
After a long illness, Queen Matilda died on 14 March 968, in the convent of Quedlinburg. She was buried in Quedlinburg Abbey, next to her late husband. Throughout her life, Matilda was dedicated to charity and her spiritual foundations – as expressed several times in her two hagiographies. A commemorative plaque dedicated to her can be found in the Walhalla memorial near Regensburg, Germany.

Canonization 
Matilda is the patron of the St. Mathilde church in Laatzen (Germany), the St. Mathilde church in Quedlinburg (Germany), the Melkite church in Aleppo (Syria), and the Mathilden-Hospital in Herford (Germany). Her feast day is 14 March.

See also
 Saint Matilda of Ringelheim, patron saint archive

References

Citations

Sources

Further reading
 Sean Gilsdorf: Queenship and Sanctity The Lives of Mathilda and The Epitaph of Adelheid, Washington, D.C., 2004.

|-

Frankish queens consort
German queens consort
Ottonian dynasty
German saints
Christian royal saints
Roman Catholic royal saints
890s births
968 deaths
Year of birth uncertain
Christian female saints of the Middle Ages
10th-century Christian saints
Duchesses of Saxony
10th-century German women
House of Immedinger
Queen mothers